Taksony Sportegyesület is a professional football club based in Taksony, Pest County, Hungary, that competes in the Nemzeti Bajnokság III, the third tier of Hungarian football.

History
Taksony were eliminated in the round of 16 of the 2018–19 Magyar Kupa by MOL Vidi FC on 4–0 aggregate.

Name changes
 1932–1946: Taksony Sportkör

Season results
As of 21 August 2018

External links
 Official website of Taksony SE
 Profile on Magyar Futball

References

Football clubs in Hungary
Association football clubs established in 1932
1932 establishments in Hungary